UFC 224: Nunes vs. Pennington was a mixed martial arts event produced by the Ultimate Fighting Championship that was held on May 12, 2018, at the Jeunesse Arena in Rio de Janeiro, Brazil.

Background
The UFC was initially targeting a UFC Women's Featherweight Championship bout between the current champion Cris Cyborg and the current UFC Women's Bantamweight Champion Amanda Nunes to take place at this event and potentially serve as the headliner. However, Cyborg was instead scheduled for a title defense at UFC 222 in March, and the plans were scrapped. In turn, it was announced on February 23 that Raquel Pennington would instead face Nunes for the bantamweight title. 

A light heavyweight bout between former UFC Light Heavyweight Championship title challengers Volkan Oezdemir and Glover Teixeira was briefly linked to take place at the event. However, Oezdemir was pulled from that pairing in favor of a matchup with former UFC Light Heavyweight Champion Maurício Rua the following week at UFC Fight Night: Maia vs. Usman.

At the weigh-ins, Mackenzie Dern weighed in at 123 pounds, seven pounds over the strawweight non-title fight upper limit of 116 pounds. As a result, the bout proceeded at catchweight, and Dern was fined 30% of her purse which went to her opponent Amanda Cooper.

This event tied the record, with UFC Fight Night: Rockhold vs. Bisping and UFC 281 for having the most finishes on a single modern UFC card with 11 finishes.

Results

Bonus awards
The following fighters were awarded $50,000 bonuses:
Fight of the Night: Kelvin Gastelum vs. Ronaldo Souza
Performance of the Night: Lyoto Machida and Aleksei Oleinyk

See also
List of UFC events
List of current UFC fighters
2018 in UFC

References

Ultimate Fighting Championship events
2018 in mixed martial arts
Mixed martial arts in Brazil
International sports competitions in Rio de Janeiro (city)
2018 in Brazilian sport
May 2018 sports events in South America